Sons of the Pioneers is a 1942 American Western film directed by Joseph Kane and starring Roy Rogers, George 'Gabby' Hayes and Bob Nolan. The film was part of the long-running series of Roy Rogers films produced by the Hollywood studio Republic Pictures.

Cast
 Roy Rogers as Roy Rogers 
 George 'Gabby' Hayes as Gabby Whittaker  
 Maris Wrixon as Louise Harper 
 Forrest Taylor as Jim Bixby 
 Minerva Urecal as Ellie Bixby 
 Bradley Page as Frank Bennett 
 Hal Taliaferro a Henchman Matt 
 Chester Conklin as Old-Timer 
 Fred Burns as Rancher  
 Sons of the Pioneers as Musicians, Cowhands

References

Bibliography
 Hurst, Richard M. Republic Studios: Beyond Poverty Row and the Majors. Scarecrow Press, 2007.

External links
 

1942 films
1942 Western (genre) films
American Western (genre) films
American black-and-white films
Films directed by Joseph Kane
Republic Pictures films
1940s English-language films
1940s American films